The Orchid (Spanish:La orquídea) is a 1951 Argentine drama film directed by Ernesto Arancibia.

Cast
 Enrique Chaico 
 Eduardo Cuitiño 
 Diana de Córdoba 
 Rafael Diserio 
 Alfredo Distasio 
 Aurelia Ferrer 
 Herminia Franco 
 Santiago Gómez Cou 
 Laura Hidalgo 
 Robert Le Vigan as The father  
 Paola Loew 
 Maruja Lopetegui 
 Domingo Mania 
 Felisa Mary 
 Liana Moabro 
 Luis Mora 
 Juan Carlos Palma 
 Jesús Pampín 
 Arsenio Perdiguero 
 Julián Pérez Ávila 
 Hilda Rey 
 Luis Rodrigo 
 Daniel Tedeschi

External links
 

1951 films
1951 drama films
1950s Spanish-language films
Argentine black-and-white films
Argentine drama films
Films directed by Ernesto Arancibia
Films shot in Buenos Aires
1950s Argentine films